The Great Bank Robbery is a 1969 Western comedy film from Warner Bros. directed by Hy Averback and written by William Peter Blatty, based on the novel by Frank O'Rourke. The movie had a soundtrack with songs by Jimmy Van Heusen.

Plot
Gold stolen by outlaws is stashed in the impenetrable bank of Friendly, a small town in Texas. A preacher, Rev. Pious Blue, is actually a thief. He and his associates, including partner Lyda Kebanov, plan to tunnel into the vault and blow it up with TNT, just as a Fourth of July celebration drowns out the noise.

There are complications. A number of rival gangs (which include Mexican bandits and a gunfighter called Slade) are also after the loot. Then there is Ben Quick of the Texas Rangers, a lawman out to find evidence confirming the corruption of banker and mayor Kincaid that is also inside the vault.

The reverend's band is successful, distracting the bank's guards by having Lyda pretend to be Lady Godiva, riding nude on a white horse, with just small flower pasties covering her nipples and groin. They intend to escape by hot-air balloon. The gold is too heavy for liftoff, however. Lyda volunteers to abandon ship, in part because she has fallen for Quick, who finds the proof he needs to convict Kincaid while the reverend and the gold fly safely away.

Cast
 Zero Mostel as Rev. Pious Blue
 Kim Novak as Sister Lyda Kebanov
 Clint Walker as Ranger Ben Quick
 Claude Akins as Slade
 Sam Jaffe as Brother Lilac Bailey
 Mako Iwamatsu (as Mako) as Secret Agent Fong
 Akim Tamiroff as Papa (Juan's father)
 Larry Storch as Juan
 John Anderson as Mayor Kincaid
 Elisha Cook, Jr. as Jeb (as Elisha Cook)
 Ruth Warrick as Mrs. Applebee
 John Larch as Sheriff of Friendly
 Peter Whitney as Brother Jordan Cass (tunneling)
 Norman Alden asThe Great Gregory (balloonist)
 Grady Sutton as Rev. Simms

Production notes
Zero Mostel uses the line "What we have here is a failure to communicate" which is similar to (and possibly a parody of or simply just a misquote of) a line from 1967's Cool Hand Luke. This line by Rev. Pious Blue is actually more often quoted than the original line and usually categorized as merely a misquote. 
The railroad scenes were filmed on the Sierra Railroad in Tuolumne County, California.

Reception

Vincent Canby of The New York Times had nothing but disdain for the picture: "The Great Bank Robbery, the Western farce that opened yesterday at neighborhood theaters, is probably the least interesting movie of 1969 through this date. I hedge because there are several films I haven't seen, and because The Great Bank Robbery is so casually inept it can't support even negative superlatives."

Film historian Leonard Maltin seemed to agree: "...A total dud, hardly worthy of the writer who gave us A Shot in the Dark and The Exorcist. Be warned."

See also
 List of American films of 1969

References

External links
 
 
 

1969 comedy films
1960s heist films
1960s Western (genre) comedy films
American heist films
American Western (genre) comedy films
Films about bank robbery
Films based on American novels
Films directed by Hy Averback
Films scored by Nelson Riddle
Films set in the 1880s
Films set in Texas
Warner Bros. films
1960s English-language films
1960s American films